The  Ministry of Finance is the Iraq government agency responsible for public finance of Iraq, Central Bank of Iraq, and banking regulations. The current Minister of Finance is Ali Allawi.

Ministers of Finance in the Kingdom of Iraq 
Sassoon Eskell, 1920-1921
Sassoon Eskell, 1921-1923
Abdel Mohsen Shalash, 1923-1924
Sassoon Eskell, 1924-1925
Abdul-Muhsin Al-Saadoun, 1925-1926
Yasin al-Hashimi, 1926-1928
Yousef Ghanima, 1928-1929
Yasin al-Hashimi, 1929-1930
Ali Jawdat al-Aiyubi, 1930
Rustum Haidar, 1930-1932
Nasrat al-Farisi, 1932-1933
Yasin al-Hashimi, ?-1933
Nasrat al-Farisi, 1933-1934
Naji al-Suwaydi, 1934
Yousef Ghanima, 1934-1935
Raouf Al Bahrani, 1935-1936
Ja'far Abu al-Timman, 1936-1937
Mohammed Ali Mahmoud, 1937
Ibrahim Kemal, 1937-1938
Rustum Haidar, 1938-1940
Raouf Al Bahrani, 1940
Naji al-Suwaydi, 1940-1941
Ali Mumtaz al-Daftary, 1941
Naji al-Suwaydi, 1941
Ibrahim Kemal, 1941
Ali Mumtaz al-Daftary, 1941-1942
Salih Jabr, 1942-1943
Jalal Baban, 1943
Abd al-Ilah Hafiz, 1943
Ali Mumtaz al-Daftary, 1943-1944
Abdul Wahab Mahmoud, 1946
Yousef Ghanima, ?-1946
Salih Jabir, 1946
Abd al-Ilah Hafiz, 1946-1947
Jamil al-Midfai, ?-?
Ali Mumtaz al-Daftary, 1948
Ibrahim Shabandar, ?-1952
Ali Mahmud al-Shaykh, 1952-1953
Ali Mumtaz al-Daftary, 1953
Abd al-Karim al-Uzri, 1953-1954
Ali Mumtaz al-Daftary, 1954
Dhia Jafar, 1954-1955
Abd al-Karim al-Uzri, ?-1958
Nadim al-Pachachi, 1958
Abd al-Karim al-Uzri, 1958

Ministers of Finance in republican Iraq 
Mohammed Hadid, 1958-1963
Salih Kubba, 1963
Muhammad Jawad al-Ubasi, 1963
Salman Al-Aswad, 1963
Muhammad Jawad al-Ubasi, 1963-1965
Salman Al-Aswad, 1965
Shukri Saleh Zaki, 1965-1966
Abdullah al-Naqshabandi, 1966-1967
Abdul Rahman al-Habib, 1967-1968
Amin Abd al-Karim, 1968-1974
Saadi Ibrahim, 1974-1975
Fawzi Abdullah al-Qaisi, 1975-1979
Thamir Razzuqi, 1979-1983
Hisham Hassan Tawfiq, 1983-1987
Hikmat Omar Mukhaylif, 1987-1989
Muhammad Mahdi Salih, 1989-1991
Majid Abd Jafar, 1991-1992
Ahmad Husayn Khudayir as-Samarrai, 1992-?
Ahmad Husayn Khudayir as-Samarrai, 1993-1994
Hikmat Mizban Ibrahim al-Azzawi, 1994-2003
Kamel al-Kilani, 2003-2004
Adil Abdul-Mahdi, 2004-2005
Ali Allawi, 2005-2006
Baqir Jabr al-Zubeidi, 2006-2010
Rafi al-Issawi, 2010-2013
Ali Yousif Al-Shukri, 2013
Safa al-Safi, 2013-?
Najeeba Najeeb, ?-2014
Hoshiyar Zebari, 2014-2016
Abdul Razzaq al-Issa, 2016-2018
Fuad Hussein, 2018-2020
Ali Allawi, 2020-2022
Ihsan Adbul Jabbar Ismael, 2022-

References

External links
Iraq Ministry of Finance official website

Foreign relations
Iraq